Hotel Ottumwa,  formerly known as the Parkview Plaza, is an historic building located in downtown Ottumwa, Iowa, United States. Built as a first-class hotel from 1916 to 1917, it is significant for the part it played in the city's social history and commercial development. By 1915, what had been Otuumwa's first-class hotel, the Ballingall Hotel, was in decline and a group of local businessmen met to plan for the new development. They organized a corporation to sell shares to the local citizens. A total of 309 people bought shares, with the average investment being $500. A further $150,000 was realized by selling bonds. A banquet was held on September 4, 1917, and a grand reception and ball was held two days later to celebrate the opening of the hotel. Over the years various businesses occupied the main floor storefronts. Bowling alleys were added in the basement in 1927. Radio station WIAS broadcast from the hotel from 1928, when it moved to Ottumwa from Burlington, Iowa, until 1934 when it went off the air. Major renovations were undertaken in 1939, 1951, and 1982. The building remains a hotel. It was listed on the National Register of Historic Places in 2012.

The Neoclassical building was designed by the prominent Des Moines architectural firm of Proudfoot, Bird and Rawson. The reinforced concrete structure was built by the J.C. Mardis Company. The exterior of the building is covered in dark brown brick and features classical details in terra cotta. From the third to the sixth floors the building is U-shaped. It is capped with a galvanized iron cornice decorated with egg-and-dart, dentils, triglyphs and metopes, rosettes, and swags.

References

External links
Hotel Ottumwa

Hotels established in 1917
Hotel buildings completed in 1917
Buildings and structures in Ottumwa, Iowa
Hotel buildings on the National Register of Historic Places in Iowa
National Register of Historic Places in Wapello County, Iowa
Neoclassical architecture in Iowa